A Current Sense Monitor is a type of monitor. It uses a high side voltage and reforms it into a proportional output current. It has a range of 20 Volts to 2.5 Volts. It is used for portable battery products.

References

Electronic circuits